The 2014–15 3. Liga was the seventh season of the 3. Liga, Germany's third-level football league.

The league consisted of twenty teams: The teams placed fourth through seventeenth of the 2013–14 season, the lowest two teams from the 2013–14 2. Bundesliga, the three promoted teams the 2013–14 Regionalliga and the losers of the relegation play-off between the 16th-placed 2. Bundesliga team and the third-placed 3. Liga team.

Teams

Stadiums and locations

Personnel and sponsorships

Managerial changes

League table

Results

Top goalscorers
Updated 23 May 2015

References

External links
DFB.de

2015-15
3
Ger